John Forsberg (born 15 April 1932) is an Australian Paralympic lawn bowls player.   He was born in Melbourne and is an amputee. At the 1984 New York/Stoke Mandeville Games, he won two silver medals in the Men's Pairs A6/8 and Men's Singles A6/8events. At the 1988 Seoul Paralympics, he won a bronze medal in the Men's Singles LB3 event. He won five gold medals at the 1990 and 1993 world championships. He also competed in lawn bowls at the 1996 Atlanta Paralympics.

References

Paralympic lawn bowls players of Australia

Lawn bowls players at the 1984 Summer Paralympics
Lawn bowls players at the 1988 Summer Paralympics
Lawn bowls players at the 1996 Summer Paralympics
Paralympic silver medalists for Australia
Paralympic bronze medalists for Australia
Amputee category Paralympic competitors
Australian amputees
Sportspeople from Melbourne
1932 births
Living people
Medalists at the 1984 Summer Paralympics
Medalists at the 1988 Summer Paralympics
Australian male bowls players
Paralympic medalists in lawn bowls
20th-century Australian people